Omanosaura cyanura, the blue-tailed lizard or blue-tailed Oman lizard, is a species of lizard in the family Lacertidae. It is found in Oman and the United Arab Emirates.

References

Omanosaura
Reptiles described in 1972
Reptiles of the Arabian Peninsula
Taxa named by Edwin Nicholas Arnold